The Nandi Awards are presented annually in Andhra Pradesh, For Telugu cinema by State government. "Nandi" means "bull", the awards being named after the big granite bull at Lepakshi — a cultural and historical symbol of Andhra Pradesh. Nandi Awards are presented in four categories: Gold, Silver, Bronze, and Copper.

The Nandi awards for the year 2008 were announced on 24 October 2009 at Hyderabad.

Nandi Awards 2008 Winners List

References

2008
2008 Indian film awards